North York Central Library is a Toronto Public Library branch located in North York, Toronto, Ontario, Canada. It is one of the two libraries in Toronto considered to be "Research and Reference Libraries", the other being the Toronto Reference Library in the city's downtown core. In contrast to the Toronto Reference Library, however, most of the items in the North York Central Library can be signed out.

The library is located inside the North York Centre twin-tower office/hotel/retail complex (5150 Yonge Street). 5150 Yonge Street is on the west side of Yonge Street (across the street from Empress Walk) and forms the north side of Mel Lastman Square. The library is adjacent North York Civic Centre, which until 1998 was the North York's City Hall. It is served by the North York Centre subway station, which has a direct underground connection to the mall containing the library.

Since 2016, the library has been undergoing a major renovation.

Services

North York Central Library has an auditorium, two large meeting rooms, and four quiet study rooms.  These spaces may be booked over the phone.  Also available are 16 study rooms designated for individual study.

The library also provides accessibility equipment, including a Braille writer, computers loaded with Kurzweil 1000 and 3000 software, magnifiers, and wheelchair accessible furniture.

North York Central Library also provides internet access to patrons through the public computer terminals and free Wi-Fi in the building.  There are 115 workstations in the library, 13 of which are in the Computer Learning Centre.  Printing and scanning is also available to patrons.  North York Central Library also has a microfilm/microfiche reader and printing machine.

Collection
In addition to the books, magazines, newspapers, DVDs, and CDs offered at the branch, North York Central Library houses its own unique selections.  Its historical collections have items pertaining to genealogy, Native peoples, North York history, and local Ontario history.  The library has materials tailored towards children like the Children's literature resource collection and the IBBY collection for Young People with Disabilities.  There are also other collections for older patrons like adult literacy works, audiobooks, and large print books.

There is, as well, a variety of multilingual collections for children and adults (in languages including Chinese, Russian along with many others) available to serve North York's ethnically diverse population.

History
Now part of the larger Toronto Public Library system, the first stand-alone facility for the North York Public Library was constructed on Yonge Street at Park Home Avenue in 1959. The Gladys Allison Building (named after the first chair of the Library Board) acted as a central library for all of North York. It served as the library until its closure on October 5, 1985, as a new branch was being built to replace it. A support branch, Central-on-Sheppard, opened to serve the community during the transition period between the closure and the opening of the new central library.

The new North York Central Library, along with the North York City Centre twin-tower office/hotel/retail complex where it is housed, opened on May 13, 1987. It was designed by Moriyama and Teshima Architects and is characterised by its seven-storey atrium.

On November 24, 2016, the Toronto Public Library announced that the branch would be closed until early 2017 for renovations. The last day of service for the branch was December 4. In February 2017, it was announced that the library would remain closed for the remainder of the year to complete more renovation work. The first two floors of the main library re-opened to the public in summer 2018, with the rest of the floors being reopened in phases.  While the branch is closed, the library has opened a temporary pop-up location in the concourse level of the adjacent mall.

See also
Toronto Public Library
Ontario Public Libraries

References

External links

Ontario Public Libraries

Library buildings completed in 1959
Public libraries in Toronto
North York
Municipal buildings in Toronto
Raymond Moriyama buildings